Colton Fretter (born March 12, 1982) is a Canadian former professional ice hockey forward.

Playing career
Born  in Harrow, Ontario, Fretter played Jr. B hockey for Chatham Maroons until 2001-2002 where they recorded no more than nine losses for three straight seasons, winning two championships and three division titles. Before attending Michigan State University he was drafted in the eighth round (230th Overall) of the 2002 NHL draft by Atlanta Thrashers, now Winnipeg Jets.

He attended four years at Michigan State University, recording 158 games, 43 goals, 69 assists, for 112 points and was a plus/minus +16 (career)

He began his professional career by playing with the Gwinnett Gladiators of the ECHL  where he played in the 2006-2007 ECHL All-Star game. He was also named ECHL rookie of the year despite missing some games due to injury. During 2007-2008 season, he split time between three teams: Gwinnett, and the Bridgeport Sound Tigers and the Chicago Wolves, both of the AHL.

Fretter signed a two-way deal with Buffalo Sabres on August 4, 2008 and was assigned to their AHL affiliate, the Portland Pirates. He played in a career high 80 games with the Pirates, scoring 40 points.

On August 3, 2009, Fretter signed a one-year contract with the Springfield Falcons of the AHL. After spending the 2010–11 season in Italy with the Bolzano-Bozen Foxes on May 20, 2011, Fretter signed a one-year contract with German DEL team, Iserlohn Roosters.

After a solitary season with Swiss club, EHC Olten of the National League B, Fretter returned to Germany on a try-out with DEL club, EHC München on July 29, 2013. Unable to secure a contract in Munich, Fretter played the season in the Austrian Hockey League with EC KAC, contributing with 36 points in 46 games.

On August 6, 2014, Fretter opted to sign a one-year contract in the EIHL with British club, the Sheffield Steelers.

Career statistics

References

External links

Living people
1982 births
Atlanta Thrashers draft picks
Bolzano HC players
Bridgeport Sound Tigers players
Canadian ice hockey right wingers
Chicago Wolves players
Gwinnett Gladiators players
Ice hockey people from Ontario
Iserlohn Roosters players
EC KAC players
EHC Kloten players
Michigan State Spartans men's ice hockey players
EHC Olten players
Portland Pirates players
Springfield Falcons players
Sheffield Steelers players
People from Essex, Ontario
Canadian expatriate ice hockey players in England
Canadian expatriate ice hockey players in Austria
Canadian expatriate ice hockey players in Italy
Canadian expatriate ice hockey players in Germany
Canadian expatriate ice hockey players in Switzerland